The national symbols of Ukraine include a variety of official and unofficial symbols and other items that are used in Ukraine to represent what is unique about the nation, reflecting different aspects of its cultural life and history.

Symbols

References